Mughanly is a village in the Zangilan District of Azerbaijan.

History
The village was located in the Armenian-occupied territories surrounding Nagorno-Karabakh, coming under the control of ethnic Armenian forces in October 1993 during the First Nagorno-Karabakh War.

The village subsequently became part of the self-proclaimed Republic of Artsakh as part of its Kashatagh Province.

It was recaptured by Azerbaijan on 20 October 2020 during the Aras Valley campaign in the 2020 Nagorno-Karabakh war.

References 

Populated places in Zangilan District